Golsar, pronounced golsâr, is a suburb of Rasht, the capital of the northern Iranian province of Gilan, south of the Caspian Sea.

Golsar is a high-class district with many shops, restaurants, boutiques, and coffee-shops, and is a very popular neighborhood for teenagers and young adults to meet and socialize with peers, particularly on Thursday and Friday nights.
The suburb used to be a very small town, which had a chain gate and security guards at its entrance until 1979. During the past couple of decades, the demand for housing in Golsar has increased and the area has grown rapidly. It is now the most expensive place in Rasht to purchase a house or apartment.

Populated places in Gilan Province